Moneydie {/ˌmʌnˈiːˌɗiː/} is a small hamlet and former parish in Perth and Kinross.

Parish history

In January 1979 the Parish of Moneydie merged with the parish of Auchtergaven in nearby Bankfoot creating Auchtergaven  and Moneydie parish.

References

Villages in Perth and Kinross